Vikas Shankar Kharage (विकास शंकर खारगे) (born 17 March 1968) is an Indian Administrative Service officer currently posted as Principal Secretary to the Chief Minister, Government of Maharashtra since 9 December 2019.

Early life and education
Vikas Kharage was born in Vita, Maharashtra, a rural town of Deccan Peninsula in Sangli District of Maharashtra, on 17 March 1968. His father, a teacher by profession, and mother Rukmini reside in Malinagar where Vikas completed his primary education.
Kharage pursued his B.E. in Electronics and Telecommunications at Government College of Engineering, Pune and later acquired an M.A. degree (Governance and Development) from IDS, University of Sussex, UK.
After graduating, he started his career as a lecturer in DKTE Engineering College at Ichalkaranji since he had an ambition for higher education in the US. However, his urge to work for people and an inclination towards the administration compelled him to quit lectureship and start preparing for UPSC. He joined the State Institute for Administrative Career in Kolhapur and Mumbai for the guidance and studies of UPSC. Meanwhile, he appeared for MPSC exam. He was successful in attaining the District Inspector of Land Record (DILR) and was posted in Pune. However, he continued to study for UPSC examination even during his probationary period as DILR. In the second attempt of UPSC, he succeeded to get the 464th rank and was selected for Indian P&T Accounts and Finance, Group-A services. However, due to his only ambition for IAS he took one-year extension and started preparing again for the exam. He cracked the UPSC examination with All India 34th rank and 1st in Maharashtra which allotted him IAS with Maharashtra cadre.

Career
Kharage started his career as an Assistant Collector from Bramhapuri in Chandrapur district of Maharashtra. Till date, Kharage has undertaken many path breaking projects which have been tremendously successful. He has worked at various districts and departments in the state of Maharashtra and has shouldered varied responsibilities. His hard work and dedication to serve the people of India and insuring positive growth in the state is highly appreciated. He remains as an inspiration to many who wish to serve the state of Maharashtra.

Prominent positions held 
 Assistant Collector, Brahmapuri, Dist-Chandrapur (1996–98)
 Chief Executive Officer at Nagpur and Chandrapur (1998–99)
 Collector and District Magistrate at Yavatmal & Aurangabad (1999-02, 2004–07)
 Joint Commissioner, Sales Tax, Mumbai (2002–03)
 Deputy Secretary, GAD, Mantralaya (2003–04)
 Director, Ground water Surveys & Development Agency, Maharashtra (2007–09)
 Commissioner (Family Welfare) and Mission Director, National Rural Health Mission, Maharashtra (2010–13)
 Managing Director, Maharashtra State Road Transport Corporation (2013–14)
 Secretary to Chief Minister of Maharashtra (2014)
 Additional Municipal Commissioner of Municipal Corporation of Greater Mumbai (2014)
 Principal Secretary, Forests & Land Acquisition, Govt. of Maharashtra (January 2015-December 2019)
 Principal Secretary to the Chief Minister (9 December 2019 to Present)

Remarkable Work

Literacy Initiatives 

After working as CEO at Chandrapur, he was posted as Collector at Yavatmal, a challenging district with 16 tehsils. He strived hard to promote adult education and increasing the literacy rates in the district. His work has been recognized and awarded at the hands of the then Prime Minister, Shri Atal Bihari Vajpayee in New Delhi.

Eradicating Child Labor Practices 
Working as a Collector at Aurangabad, he handled many issues which focused on eradicating child labor. In his INDUS Child Labor project, 4000 children were withdrawn from labor and mainstreamed in education. This got him great recognition in the country. When the Godavari river was flooded, he undertook the task of rescuing and rehabilitating the people there, with the help and involvement of other departments from the government and communities.

Ensuring Communal Harmony 

His work has ensured communal harmony in Aurangabad which was recognized and he was awarded with the Mahatma Gandhi Peace Award, for maintaining peace and communal harmony, through the hands of the then CM of Maharashtra, Shri Vilasrao Deshmukh.

Innovations in the Technical Organization 
Kharage was posted as Director, Groundwater Surveys and Development Agency in July 2007. He initiated a design study and commenced a Dual Hand Pump System for drinking water purpose. This pump had the unique ability to run on electricity and solar energy, with manual option available as a backup. He made special efforts for the awareness of groundwater resource, its development and judicial use. Through this scheme, rainwater harvesting becomes mandatory. Pumped water through a single-phase submersible pump is installed in the existing high yielding borewell and the water is stored in a 5,000-litre tank and water supply is provided to each house through a tap. He also contributed to mitigate the drinking water crisis in the Pune Municipal Corporation in 2008–09.

Due to Kharage's initiatives, state's first groundwater study was conducted in Ichalkaranji Municipal Council area. The council was given several remedial options to tackle some groundwater issues. The organization's work was nominated by the state for Prime Minister's Excellence Award in Organization category in 2009. In his dissertation at the University of Sussex, titled "Organisational Change: From Blue Print approach Organization to Community-Oriented Organisation, with a case study of Groundwater Surveys and Development Agency, Government of Maharashtra, India", he talks about how and why organization changes to adopt participatory approach.. The dissertation also probed the challenge of institutionalizing changes and make them sustainable in the long run.

Initiatives in the Health Sector 
Kharage has implemented, monitored and supervised various maternal and child health related programs while working as a Commissioner (Family Welfare) and Mission Director at National Rural Health Mission. He worked on improving health indicators such as IMR (reducing it from 34 to 25), MMR (from 104 to 67) & improving the sex ratio at birth (from 883 to 934). He also contributed in designing, developing and implementing '108 Health Ambulance service' in Maharashtra, where currently 972 BLS and ALS ambulances are in operation. He also commenced the paperless working of his office and gained the identity of first e-office in the state of Maharashtra.
These efforts were also recognized when he was conferred the state level first prize of Rs. 10 Lakhs in Rajiv Gandhi Prashaskiya Gatimanta Abhiyan Award at the hands of the CM of Maharashtra in 2012. He also received an appreciation from the Chief Minister of Maharashtra for leading the rescue team of Maharashtra officials during the Uttarakhand cloud burst disaster in June 2013. Around 3000 Maharashtra pilgrims and tourists were rescued and sent back to state safely.

Contribution as Secretary (Forests) 
In his role as Secretary (Forests) for Government of Maharashtra, he launched multiple initiatives such as Mega Plantation Drive, conservation activities in Tadoba Andhari Tiger Reserve, commencing Green Army, etc. The Mega Plantation Drive set the objective of planting 50 Crore trees in three years in the State of Maharashtra. To gather public support for plantation, a 'Green Army' of volunteers was established.

Revitalizing Bamboo Sector 
Bamboo sector was a restricted domain with lesser development and knowledge to the community. However, with Hon’ble Forest Minister Shri Sudhir Mungantiwar's eminent leadership and Kharage's initiatives, as a Secretary (Forests), Government of Maharashtra established state's first Bamboo Research and Training Centre at Chandrapur. Today, no permission is required for planting, cutting and transporting bamboo. This move has encouraged the bamboo plantation transforming it from a forest product to an agricultural product. Massive plantation, harvesting and transportation has been going on due to such liberalization policy. Initially, the use of bamboo was known only in making handicrafts. Subsequently, the use of bamboo in various sectors such as in industry, construction, textile and for making furniture was acknowledged. Also, the use of bamboo shoots as a food product was also recognized. The Forest Department also offers a 2-year diploma course to develop skilled expertise in bamboo plantation. Maharashtra is the only state in the country to start such academic course. Further, Maharashtra Bamboo Promotion Foundation in partnership with Tata Trust was established under the section (8) of the company's Act. It works on the principle of "Not for Profit", promotes and facilitate various activities such as organizing bamboo bazar, offering consultancy for construction of bamboo houses, industrial usage, furniture making etc. To revitalize the bamboo sector, the Forest Department initiated the activation of Bamboo Handicraft and Art Unit (BHAU) in 3 universities of Maharashtra namely, Sant Gadge Baba Amravati University, Savitribai Phule Pune University and Mahatma Phule Krishi Vidyapeeth at Rahuri. The unit aims to impart training and skills to the students who can then work into the bamboo sector.

Mega plantation drive in Maharashtra 
Mega plantation drive was launched under the leadership of Honourable Forest Minister Shri Sudhir Mungantiwar, in 2015 to mitigate adverse effects of global warming and maintain ecological balance. Forest Department took the efforts of going an extra mile to plant 50 crore trees in 3 years during "Plantation Week" celebrated between 1 July and 7 July every year. The record making plantation of 2.82 crore on a single day of 1 July 2016 was achieved and has been acknowledged by the Limca Book of Record. The Prime Minister himself mentioned the tree plantation efforts made by the Forest Department in his "Mann Ki Baat" program on 31 July and appreciated the campaign as a People's Movement.

Kharage insisted for the due attention for aftercare survival of plantation which is being monitored by the IT board which developed an application along with geotagging of the saplings making this activity open to the public domain. Transparency is maintained in the system.

The efforts of Maharashtra in various sectors are officially recognized by the Government of India. Following are the four areas where the state of Maharashtra is leading and also documented in the "Status Report on Forest for 2017" at All India level, published by "Forest Survey of India" in February, 2018:

 Tree cover in Non-Forest Area has increased by 
 The Mangrove cover has increased by 
 Water bodies in Forest Area has gone up by 
 Increase in the Bamboo plantation area by 

Maharashtra ranks first in the forest cover in forestry.
 The Mangrove cover has increased by 
Increase in mangroves is mainly seen in Raigad, Mumbai suburbs, Thane, Ratnagiri and Sindhudurg districts. Maharashtra stands second in the country in mangrove cover.

In the Indian Forest Survey report from 2014 to 2019, a  area has been announced as Reserved Forests in Maharashtra. Owing to this, Maharashtra has received great name and respect, in terms of environment balance and protection and this work has been mentioned in the IFSR. In a first of its kind, a 24-hour toll free helpline number 1926 called 'Hello Forest' has been set up to provide information regarding plantations, protection and mass awareness. The Forest Department has created a mobile application called 'My Plants' to record details of the plantations such as numbers, species and location into the Forest Department's database. To encourage public participation, the SFD has initiated the 'Maharashtra Harit Sena or Green Army'.

Tiger estimation 
Earlier, the counting of the tiger or the chances of a tiger sighting could be guessed by their pugmarks. By using this method, their counting was inaccurate.  Having had this in mind, National Tiger Conservation Institute of the Central Government along with the Wildlife Institute of India, formulated a new way for tiger census in 2006. According to the India Tiger Estimation – 2018, the count of tigers in Maharashtra sums up to 312 in total across all districts. The Tiger Census is done every 4 years.

Contribution in the Land Acquisition 
Vikas Kharage, while handling the subject of Land Acquisition, developed the policy of 'Direct Purchase of Private Land’ through negotiation with the land owners. The process of direct purchase from land owners works in a simpler, faster and transparent way. The policy offers 25% extra compensation than the compensation received as per the Land Acquisition Act. This initiative has been found to be effective in acquiring the land in a short period.

The infrastructural projects in the State like construction of National Highways, Nagpur-Mumbai Prosperity Corridor, Railway Projects etc. require acquisition of a private land. Kharage worked with District Collectors and monitored the land acquisition machinery in the field to acquire the requisite land on priority basis under various Acts. Such diligent working has facilitated the State Government to complete various infrastructural projects within the stipulated time period.

Kharage Committee 
During the posting as Principal Secretary (Forests), Vikas Kharage headed a Committee (later popularly known as Kharage Committee) appointed to study the issues of Moha flowers and make recommendations to the Government on liberalisations of Moha flower trade. Accepting all the recommendations of Kharage Committee, the collection, storage, transportation and trade of Moha flowers is now liberalised removing various permissions required earlier. Excise department has issued a Government Resolution (GR) accordingly mentioning the acceptance of the Kharage Committee's recommendations. This decision will be mainly beneficial to the tribal community, who are engaged in the Moha flower collection, to raise their incomes.

Honours 
 Satyen Mitra National Award for successful implementation of Literacy program in Yavatmal district at the hands of Hon Prime Minister of India. (2001)
 Mahatma Gandhi Peace Award for maintaining communal harmony in Aurangabad district at the hands of Hon Chief Minister of Maharashtra. (2006)
 Rajiv Gandhi Administrative Reforms Award for making NRHM office as 1st paperless e-office in the state of Maharashtra at the hands of Hon. Chief Minister of Maharashtra. (2012)
 9th Earth Care Award for adopting an integrated approach to afforestation with holistic information technology interventions from plantation planning to post plantation survival monitoring. (2019)
 'COEP Abhiman' awarded by the Alumni Association of College of Engineering Pune (COEP) to recognize his outstanding contribution in the diversified domain of human welfare. Due to Corona pandemic, the Award Ceremony was held online. 
'Paryavaran Mitra' award at the hands of Hon. Governor of Maharashtra Bhagat Singh Koshyari given by Karnala Charitable Trust, Pune for commendable achievement of 50 crore tree plantation in the State.

International Exposure 
 Completed PG course in MA in Governance and Development at IDS, Sussex University, UK (August 2009-July 2010)
 Deliberated in the World Water Week Conference at Stockholm, Sweden (2008)
 Deliberated in the International Conference on Urban Health, Belo Horizonte, Brazil (2010)
 Mid-Career Training program for IAS officers - Exposure visit to South Korea (08-19 May 2011)
 Participated in International Conference on Malnutrition, Dhaka, Bangladesh (2011)
 Deliberated in the International Conference on Maternal Health Kuala Lumpur, Malaysia
 Deliberated in the Seminar on Smart City at Barcelona, Spain (2014)
 Study visit at zoo, night safari, bird park, Singapore (25-28 June 2015)
 Study visit at Maasai Mara National Park, Kenya (24-29 October 2015)
 Study visit to China to gain insights in the bamboo sector (11-19 July 2017)
 Attended one-week course on Rethinking Financial Inclusion at Harvard University, USA (7-15 October 2017)
 Study visit to Dubai, to UAE at Glow Garden, Dubai Safari (14-18 February 2018)
 Participated and made a presentation at COP 24 International Climate Change conference at Katowice, Poland (6-10 December 2018)
 Study visit to Israel on tissue culture, micro-irrigation techniques and wildlife crisis (6-11 May 2019)

Written works by Kharage 
He has authored the book Panchayat Raj System: A New Role published by Yashada, Pune.

2nd book released on own experiences: Vikas Kharage has recently released a book "Ek Harit Chalval" (Marathi Edition) at the hands of Chief Minister of Maharashtra, Shri. Uddhav Thackeray in January 2021. This book is published by Saket Publication, Aurangabad and depicts an extremely powerful story of the 50 crore tree plantation movement carried out in the state in 3 years period i.e.  2017, 2018 & 2019. Vikas Kharage is well known for his sensitivity over the environmental aspects. Enhancing tree cover is essential in today's era particularly when the issues such as pollution, deforestation, global warming and climate change have endangered our existence. The state's tree cover (forest cover on forest land + tree cover on non-forest land) is around 20% which is far less than required figure of 33%. Plantation of trees and its further maintenance is a herculean task and, thus, cannot be accomplished by the government alone. Considering such factors, Vikas Kharage in the role of Principal Secretary (Forests), led the plantation movement with people participation and involving various stakeholders. Many new schemes have been initiated for achieving the mission of plantation in the state. 21st century generation. It gives reader a fascinating experience and certainly it's a pleasure to accompany "Ek Harit Chalval" on its admiring journey. In the end one gets triggered for planting and nourishing trees which is the biggest hype around this book.

References

Indian Administrative Service officers
People from Maharashtra
Alumni of the University of Sussex
Living people
1968 births